Enea Cerquetti (14 January 1938 – 21 September 2021) was an Italian politician.

Biography
Cerquetti was a member of the Italian Communist Party (PCI) and began his career as Mayor of Cinisello Balsamo, serving from 1970 to 1979. In 1979, he was elected to the Chamber of Deputies and served in the 8th and 9th Legislatures. In his first term, he served on the Weapons and Military Use Committee from 5 March 1981 to 18 March 1982 and from 10 June 1982 to 11 July 1983. He also served on the Defense Committee from 11 July 1979 to 11 July 1983. He heavily focused on military and security issues and signed a bill on local police regulations on 12 May 1980, and one on the use of armed forces on 27 April 1983.

Cerquetti was re-elected in 1983 and served on the Elections Committee from 19 July 1983 to 1 July 1987. He also served on the Defense Committee from 12 July 1983 to 1 July 1987. He served on the Italian Parliamentary Delegation to the NATO Parliamentary Assembly from 15 March 1984 to 1 July 1987. After his time in the Chamber of Deputies, he served as Mayor of Cusano Milanino from 1990 to 1994, a period in which he switched from the Italian Communist Party to the Democratic Party of the Left. He ran for re-election in 1994, but experienced conflicts within his party. He was supported by Lega Nord and the Italian People's Party, but failed to be re-elected.

Enea Cerquetti died in Cinisello Balsamo on 21 September 2021 at the age of 83.

References

1938 births
2021 deaths
Italian politicians
Deputies of Legislature VIII of Italy
Deputies of Legislature IX of Italy
Mayors of places in Italy
Italian Communist Party politicians
Democratic Party of the Left politicians
Politicians from Milan